Johann Georg de Hamilton (1672 – 1737), was an 18th-century painter from the Southern Netherlands active in Austria.

Biography
He was born in Munich as the son of the Scottish painter James de Hamilton, who taught him to paint. From 1689 he was court painter in Vienna, then after that he moved to Berlin, but after 1718 he was back in Vienna. He is known for hunting scenes like his brother Philipp Ferdinand.

References

Johann Georg de Hamilton on Artnet

1672 births
1737 deaths
Painters from the Austrian Netherlands
Artists from Brussels
Court painters